Freaky Eaters is an American documentary television program based on the BBC program of the same name that aired on TLC. It was hosted by psychotherapist Mike Dow, and co-hosted by nutrition specialist J.J. Virgin. The program aired over two seasons, from September 5, 2010 to June 26, 2011. It never returned for a third season and was abruptly cancelled in the spring of 2011, with the last episode airing on June 26, 2011.

Synopsis
The program deals with people who have bizarre addictions to food and/or eating disorders. Like the BBC program it is based on, each episode is titled with the words "Addicted to" and then whatever the food is. The program's first episode aired on September 5, 2010. Psychotherapist Mike Dow and nutritionist J.J. Virgin host the program. Voiceover actor Josh Artis is the program's narrator. At the end of most episodes, the people get help and most of the time stop their addictions and live healthier lifestyles.

Episodes

Series overview

Season 1 (2010)

Season 2 (2011)

References

External links
 Freaky Eaters schedule at TLC
 Freaky Eaters at Shed Media
 Freaky Eaters at The Futon Critic
 Dr. Mike Dow Official site
 JJ Virgin Official site

English-language television shows
TLC (TV network) original programming
2010 American television series debuts
2011 American television series endings
2010s American documentary television series